Birhan Tesfaye Nebebew (born 14 August 1994) is an Ethiopian male long-distance runner who competes in track, road and cross country running.

He first emerged on the road with runner-up finishes at the 2012 Rennes 10K and Istanbul 15K. He won the latter race the following year. His international debut came at the 2013 IAAF World Cross Country Championships, where he placed sixth and shared in the team gold. He gained selection with a runner-up finish in the junior section at the Jan Meda Cross Country behind Hagos Gebrhiwet.

Birhan had four wins on the professional circuit in 2014: two French cross country races, Cross de l'Acier and Cross Ouest-France, and two American road races, the Cooper River Bridge Run and Hy-Vee Road Races. He received his first senior national call-up that year but failed to finish the 10,000 metres at the 2014 African Championships in Athletics. After a quiet 2015, he was runner-up at the 2016 Ethiopian Cross Country Championships and took tenth and a team bronze medal at the 2016 African Cross Country Championships.

International competitions

Circuit wins
Cross de l'Acier: 2014
Cross Ouest-France: 2014
Cooper River Bridge Run: 2014
Hy-Vee Road Races: 2014
Istanbul 15K: 2013

References

External links

All-athletics profile

Living people
1994 births
Ethiopian male long-distance runners
Ethiopian male marathon runners
Ethiopian male cross country runners
20th-century Ethiopian people
21st-century Ethiopian people